A hippo or hippopotamus is either of two species of large African mammal which live mainly in and near water:
 Hippopotamus
 Pygmy hippopotamus

Hippo or Hippos may also refer to:

Toponymy
 The ancient city of Hippo Regius  (modern Annaba, Algeria)
 The ancient city of Hippo Diarrhytus (modern Bizerte, Tunisia) 
 Hippo, Kentucky
 Hippos (Golan Heights), an archaeological site in the Israel–Syria DMZ

Given names
 Hippo (Greek woman), a Greek woman mentioned by Valerius Maximus as an example of chastity
 Hippo (philosopher), a Presocratic Greek philosopher
 Hippo Galloway (1882–1943), American-Canadian professional baseball player
 Hippo, one of the mythical Oceanids
 Hippo, one of the daughters of the mythical Thespius
 Hippo, one of the mythical Amazons
 Hippo, one of the Leuctrides
 Hippo, a powerful gangster character in the 2015 Neill Blomkamp film Chappie

Brand and product names
 Hippo CMS, an open-source content management system
 Hippo (Company), an American property insurance company based in Palo Alto, California

Other
 Hippo APC, a South African armoured personnel carrier
 Hippo (Hpo), a protein kinase involved in the Hippo signaling pathway
 Hippo Family Club, a multilingual club originated from Japan
 "Hippo" (The Brak Show), a 2001 episode
 The Hippos, an American band
 The Hippos (Australian band)
 HIPPO, highest paid person's opinion. It is often a deciding factor in what decisions and next steps a team takes

See also
 Augustine of Hippo
 Hipo (disambiguation)
 Hippopotamus (disambiguation)
 Hungry Hungry Hippos, a children's game marketed by Milton Bradley
 King Hippo, a fictional boxer from Nintendo's Punch-Out!! series
 Tree warbler, genus Hippolais